Petre Lupan (born 12 June 1950) is a Romanian middle-distance runner. He competed in the men's 1500 metres at the 1972 Summer Olympics.

References

1950 births
Living people
Athletes (track and field) at the 1972 Summer Olympics
Romanian male middle-distance runners
Olympic athletes of Romania
Place of birth missing (living people)